The Olympic Order, established in 1975, is the highest award of the Olympic Movement. It is awarded for particularly distinguished contributions to the Olympic Movement, i.e. recognition of efforts worthy of merit in the cause of sport. Traditionally, the IOC bestows the Olympic Order upon the chief national organiser(s) at the closing ceremony of each respective Olympic Games.

History
The Olympic Order was established in May 1975 by the International Olympic Committee as a successor to the Olympic Diploma of Merit. The Olympic Order originally had three grades (gold, silver and bronze).

In 1984, at the  87th IOC Session in Sarajevo (Yugoslavia), it was decided that in future there would be no distinction between the silver and bronze order. The gold order would continue to be awarded to heads of state and for exceptional circumstances.

Design
The insignia of the Olympic Order is in the form of a collar (or chain), in Gold, Silver or Bronze according to grade; the front of the chain depicts the five rings of the Olympic Movement, flanked on either side by kotinos emblem (olive wreath).  A lapel badge, in the form of miniature five rings and kotinos in Gold, Silver and Bronze according to grade, is presented to recipients to wear as appropriate.

Recipients 

The following is a list of recipients of the Olympic Order. Some no longer have their orders, as they have been withdrawn.

Gold Olympic Order

Silver Olympic Order

Bronze Olympic Order

Recipients with missing data
Following is the list of recipients of Olympic Order with some missing data like year of award, country and colour of award.

Trivia
Nadia Comăneci became one of the youngest recipients of the Olympic Order in 1984 when she was only 23 years old at the time of her award. She is also one of the two only athletes to be awarded the Olympic Order twice (1984, 2004), the other one being the Brazilian Carlos Arthur Nuzman.

See also
 Olympic Symbols
 Bertoni, Milano
 Recipients of the Olympic Order
 Olympic Cup
 Pierre de Coubertin Medal
 Olympic Order in Artistic Gymnastics

References

External links 

 List of recipients of the Olympic Order at Olympedia.org

 
Awards established in 1975
International Olympic Committee
International orders, decorations, and medals
Order
Sports trophies and awards